This article gives the summarized final standings of each FIVB Volleyball Women's Nations League tournament, an annual competition involving national women's volleyball teams. 

After the fourth edition in 2022, United States won three golds (2018, 2019, 2021), Italy won one gold medal (2022), Turkey won silver (2018) and bronze (2021), Brazil won three silvers (2019, 2021, 2022), China won two bronze (2018, 2019), and Serbia won one bronze medal (2022).

Results summary

2018 FIVB Volleyball Women's Nations League statistics

Squads

The 16 national teams involved in the tournament were required to register a squad of 21 players, which every week's 14-player roster must be selected from. Each country must declare its 14-player roster two days before the start of each week's round-robin competition.

Preliminary round

Ranking

Final round 2018

 Champions   Runners up   Third place   Fourth place

|}

Tournament statistics

 Matches played : 130
 Attendance	 : 399,149 (3,070 per match)

 Total sets (preliminary round)  : 443 
 Total sets (final round)  : 38
 Total sets  scored : 481 (3.7 per match)

 Total points (preliminary round)  : 19,250
 Total points (final round)  : 1,670
 Total points scored  : 20,920 (161 per match)

2019 FIVB Volleyball Women's Nations League statistics

Squads

The 16 national teams involved in the tournament were required to register a squad of 25 players, which every week's 14-player roster must be selected from. Each country must declare its 14-player roster two days before the start of each week's round-robin competition.

Preliminary round

Ranking

Final round 2019

 Champions   Runners up   Third place   Fourth place

|}

Tournament statistics

 Matches played : 130
 Attendance	 : 399,575 (3,074 per match)

 Total sets (preliminary round)  : 443 
 Total sets (final round)  : 40
 Total sets  scored : 483 (3.7 per match)

 Total points (preliminary round)  : 19,486
 Total points (final round)  : 1,735
 Total points scored  : 21,221 (163 per match)

2021 FIVB Volleyball Women's Nations League statistics

Squads

The 16 teams compete in a round-robin format. The teams play 3 matches each week and compete five weeks long, for 120 matches. The top four teams after the preliminary round compete in the final round.

Preliminary round

Ranking

Final round 2021

 Champions   Runners up   Third place   Fourth place

|}

Tournament statistics

 Matches played : 124 
 Attendance	 : 0  no spectators due to COVID-19 pandemic.

 Total sets (preliminary round)  : 446  
 Total sets (final round)  :  14
 Total sets  scored :  460 (3.71 per match)

 Total points (preliminary round)  : 19,229
 Total points (final round)  : 651 
 Total points scored  : 19,880 (160 per match)

2022 FIVB Women's Volleyball Nations League statistics

Squads

Preliminary round

In the 2022 tournament, the format of play was changed. The new format will see 16 women's teams competing in pools of 8 teams during the pool phase. Eight teams will then move into the final knockout phase of the competition.

Ranking

Final round 2022
The VNL Finals will see the seven strongest teams along with the finals host country Turkey moving directly to the knockout phase which will consist of eight matches in total: four quarterfinals, two semi-finals and the bronze and gold medal matches.

 Champions   Runners up   Third place   Fourth place

|}

Tournament statistics

 Matches played : 104
 Attendance	 : 256,881 (2,470 per match)

 Total sets (preliminary round)  : 360
 Total sets (final round)  : 30
 Total sets  scored : 390 (3.75 per match)

 Total points (preliminary round)  : 15,712
 Total points (final round)  : 1,387
 Total points scored  : 17,099 (164 per match)

Medals summary

Volleyball Nations League (2018–present)

Team participations

Appearance

Team performances by season

Statistics leaders

Preliminary round

Final Round

Individual awards

VNL Dream Team

All-time team records

Change since previous year rankings.
Table current through the end of 2022 edition

Standing procedure 
 Total number of victories (matches won, matches lost)
 In the event of a tie, the following first tiebreaker will apply: The teams will be ranked by the most points gained per match as follows:
Match won 3–0 or 3–1: 3 points for the winner, 0 points for the loser
Match won 3–2: 2 points for the winner, 1 point for the loser
Match forfeited: 3 points for the winner, 0 points (0–25, 0–25, 0–25) for the loser
 If teams are still tied after examining the number of victories and points gained, then the FIVB will examine the results in order to break the tie in the following order:
Sets quotient: if two or more teams are tied on the number of points gained, they will be ranked by the quotient resulting from the division of the number of all sets won by the number of all sets lost.
Points quotient: if the tie persists based on the sets quotient, the teams will be ranked by the quotient resulting from the division of all points scored by the total of points lost during all sets.
If the tie persists based on the points quotient, the tie will be broken based on the team that won the match of the Round Robin Phase between the tied teams. When the tie in points quotient is between three or more teams, these teams ranked taking into consideration only the matches involving the teams in question.

See also

FIVB Volleyball Men's Nations League
FIVB Volleyball Men's Nations League statistics
Volleyball records and statistics
Major achievements in volleyball by nation
List of Indoor Volleyball World Medalists

Notes

References

External links
Fédération Internationale de Volleyball – official website
FIVB Volleyball Nations League 2018 – official website
FIVB Volleyball Nations League 2019 – official website
FIVB Volleyball Nations League 2021 – official website
FIVB Volleyball Nations League 2022 – official website

statistics
Volleyball records and statistics
Volleyball-related lists